New Prairie is a ghost town in New Prairie Township in Pope County, Minnesota, United States. It lies between the cities of Cyrus and Starbuck.

History
The village of New Prairie had a post office from 1872 until 1883, and again from 1920 until 1946.  New Prairie also had a station of the Northern Pacific Railroad.

Notes

Former populated places in Minnesota
Former populated places in Pope County, Minnesota